The Holden Elizabeth Plant was a vehicle manufacturing facility in the township of Elizabeth, South Australia which operated from 1963 until 2017. It succeeded the Woodville Plant as South Australia's main assembly facility. 

The plant pressed and assembled bodies with engines from its Port Melbourne Plant in Victoria.

History
The plant opened in 1963, after the majority of tooling from the Woodville Plant was transferred to Elizabeth. The first vehicle produced at the plant was the Holden EH.

Elizabeth became the last remaining Holden plant in 1989 after Dandenong closed. After production of the VL Commodore ceased.

In 2006, the plant underwent a redesign known to have cost more than $1 Billion (AUD), this budget was shared with Holdens development of the General Motors Zeta platform, of which's introduction in the Fourth Generation VE Commodore led to the retooling of the facility. 

Australian production of the Cruze ceased in 2016, Leaving the Commodore and its Ute derivative to be the only vehicles being produced at the plant. 

The Elizabeth facility was the last large scale automotive manufacturing facility in Australia to close after the Mitsubishi Australia in 2008, Ford Australia in 2016, and Toyota Australia earlier in 2017. 

Holden Special Vehicles, Holdens Melbourne based, factory backed Performance subsidiary ordered 300 Holden Commodore sedans months in advance to the plants closure in preparation for Holden's last hurrah, the Gen F2 HSV GTSR W1, surplus LS9 V8s from Chevrolet's C6 ZR1 gives the Holden a thunderous 474kW of power and 815Nm of torque. These vehicles are now worth upward of $1 Million (AUD).

The last vehicle, a 'Red Hot' VF Holden Commodore SS V Redline (which is currently in the collection at the National Motor Museum, Birdwood) rolled off the line on October 20, 2017.

Products
 Holden EH-WB (1963-1984)
 Statesman (1971-1984)
 Holden Commodore (1979-2017)
 Holden Ute (2000-2017)
 Holden Statesman/Caprice (1990-2017)
 Holden Cruze (2011-2016)

References 

General Motors factories
Former motor vehicle assembly plants
Motor vehicle assembly plants in Australia
Vehicle manufacturing companies established  in 1865
Vehicle manufacturing companies disestablished in 2020
Demolished buildings and structures in South Australia